Tạ Thái Học (born 17 July 1988 in Lai Châu, Vietnam) is a Vietnamese footballer who plays as a striker for Bình Phước in V.League 2.

Career

Despite playing as a forward, Thái Học has thus far only scored a couple goals in his 6 years as a footballer. This is part due to various injuries he has had. Nonetheless coaches have referred to Thái Học as a hardworking and dedicated player.

In July 2016 Thái Học suffered a serious injury to his right projected to keep him out for 8–12 months. This was the third such injury to happen to Thái Học in his career.

Personal life
Thái Học is married to Đặng Thị Hoài Thanh, whom he wed in a private ceremony. After scoring a goal in a cup game against Viettel in 2016 Thái Học celebrated by tucking the ball under his shirt in homage to his pregnant wife.

References

1988 births
Living people
Vietnamese footballers
V.League 1 players
Hoang Anh Gia Lai FC players
Association football forwards